Vicente de Araújo Neto (born 1 October 1966) is a Brazilian equestrian. He competed in the team eventing at the 2000 Summer Olympics.

References

1966 births
Living people
Brazilian male equestrians
Olympic equestrians of Brazil
Equestrians at the 2000 Summer Olympics
Sportspeople from Belo Horizonte